Montpelier is a village in Williams County, Ohio, United States. The population was 4,072 at the 2010 census.

History
Montpelier was platted in 1845. The village was named after Montpelier, Vermont. A post office has been in operation at Montpelier since 1846. Montpelier was incorporated as a village in 1875.

Geography
Montpelier is located at  (41.582981, -84.604204).

Demographics

2010 census
As of the census of 2010, there were 4,072 people, 1,649 households, and 1,055 families living in the village. The racial makeup of the village was 96.2% White, 0.1% African American, 0.5% Native American, 1.4% Asian, 0.4% from other races, and 1.3% from two or more races. Hispanic or Latino of any race were 3.4% of the population.

There were 1,649 households, of which 33.4% had children under the age of 18 living with them, 42.4% were married couples living together, 15.0% had a female householder with no husband present, 6.5% had a male householder with no wife present, and 36.0% were non-families. 30.7% of all households were made up of individuals, and 12.4% had someone living alone who was 65 years of age or older. The average household size was 2.43 and the average family size was 3.00.

The median age in the village was 36.1 years. 26.9% of residents were under the age of 18; 8% were between the ages of 18 and 24; 26.2% were from 25 to 44; 24.5% were from 45 to 64; and 14.5% were 65 years of age or older. The gender makeup of the village was 47.5% male and 52.5% female.

2000 census
As of the census of 2000, there were 4,320 people, 1,751 households, and 1,131 families living in the village. The population density was 1,601.0 people per square mile (617.8/km2). There were 1,866 housing units at an average density of 691.5 per square mile (266.8/km2). The racial makeup of the village was 96.62% White, 0.30% African American, 0.16% Native American, 1.48% Asian, 0.02% Pacific Islander, 0.65% from other races, and 0.76% from two or more races. Hispanic or Latino of any race were 1.53% of the population.

There were 1,751 households, out of which 33.6% had children under the age of 18 living with them, 48.0% were married couples living together, 11.8% had a female householder with no husband present, and 35.4% were non-families. 30.2% of all households were made up of individuals, and 15.1% had someone living alone who was 65 years of age or older. The average household size was 2.43 and the average family size was 2.99.

In the village, the population was spread out, with 27.4% under the age of 18, 9.8% from 18 to 24, 27.6% from 25 to 44, 19.0% from 45 to 64, and 16.2% who were 65 years of age or older. The median age was 34 years. For every 100 females there were 90.2 males. For every 100 females age 18 and over, there were 86.2 males.

The median income for a household in the village was $31,678, and the median income for a family was $41,250. Males had a median income of $31,389 versus $21,508 for females. The per capita income for the village was $14,791. About 4.3% of families and 6.2% of the population were below the poverty line, including 5.2% of those under age 18 and 7.3% of those age 65 or over.

State highways

Village government
Montpelier is a Charter Village with a strong Manager/Village Council form of government.  The Village Manager is currently Jason Rockey and the Village Mayor is Steve Yagelski.

The Village of Montpelier also provides citizens with central services such as water, electric, and sewer. Montpelier is provided public safety services by a full-time police department and a full-time fire chief, who commands a volunteer fire staff.

Education
Montpelier is served by the Montpelier Exempted Village School District.  Montpelier Junior/Senior High School and Montpelier Elementary School share the same campus, which is located on the village's south side.  Their nickname is the Locomotives.  They are a member of the Buckeye Border Conference, Toledo Area Athletic Conference for football, and Northwest Ohio Athletic League for wrestling.

Water quality awards
In 2003, 2006, and 2007, and 2017  Montpelier won the Berkeley Springs International Water Tasting competition for its municipal water supply. Montpelier triumphed over cities as diverse as Sparwood, British Columbia and Rice Lake, Wisconsin.

County fairgrounds
The Williams County Fairgrounds is located on Montpelier's east side.  The Williams County Historical Museum is located on the fairgrounds.

Notable people
 Jon Husted, American politician serving as the Lieutenant Governor of Ohio since 2019, previously Secretary of State of Ohio and Speaker of the Ohio House of Representatives
 Zach Roerig, actor
 Paul Siple, Antarctic explorer who, with Charles F. Passel, developed the first formula and table for measuring wind chill, a term which Siple coined

References

External links
 Village website
 School district website

Villages in Williams County, Ohio
Villages in Ohio